Zambia competed in the 2003 All-Africa Games held at the National Stadium in the city of Abuja, Nigeria. The country sent a substantial team which won six medals and came joint twenty-third in the medal table. Amon Simutowe won a silver medal in chess. The team also received five bronze medals, including two in boxing and the team medals in chess and squash.

Competitors
Zambia entered forty events, thirty eight for men and two for women. Competitors included a chess team that contained two strong players, Stanley Chumfwa and Amon Simutowe.
Squash, which appeared for the first time at the Games, was well represented, with athletes O'Neal Chilambwe, Lazarus Chilufa and Richard Twali entering both as individuals and a team. Chilufa reached the quarter finals, until he was beaten by Egypt’s Mohamed Abbas, while the team reached the semi-finals, until being beaten by Abbas’ team which then went on to win gold. In football, the team qualified in Group A, coming second to Nigeria, but losing to Ghana in the bronze medal play-off. Prince Mumba ran in the 800 metres, reaching the semi-finals.

Medal summary
Zambia won six medals, a silver and five bronze medals, and was ranked joint twenty third in the final medal table alongside Congo and Mali.

Medal table

List of Medalists

Silver Medal

Bronze Medal

See also
 Zambia at the African Games

References

2003 in Zambian sport
Nations at the 2003 All-Africa Games
2003